Prainha is a municipality in the state of Pará in Brazil. The population is 29,846 (2020 est.) in an area of 14,787 km². The elevation is 70 m.  It is located on the Amazon River.

References

Municipalities in Pará
Populated places on the Amazon